German submarine U-2514 was a Type XXI U-boat (one of the "Elektroboote") of Nazi Germany's Kriegsmarine, built for service in World War II. She was ordered on 6 November 1943, and was laid down on 24 July 1944 at the Blohm & Voss yard at Hamburg, as yard number 2514. She was launched on 17 September 1944, and commissioned under the command of Kapitänleutnant Rolf-Birger Wahlen on 17 October 1944.

Design
Like all Type XXI U-boats, U-2514 had a displacement of  when at the surface and  while submerged. The submarine was powered by two MAN SE supercharged six-cylinder M6V40/46KBB diesel engines each providing , two Siemens-Schuckert GU365/30 double-acting electric motors each providing , and two Siemens-Schuckert silent running GV232/28 electric motors each providing .

U-2514 was fitted with six  torpedo tubes in the bow and four  C/30 anti-aircraft guns. She could carry twenty-three torpedoes or seventeen torpedoes and twelve mines. The complement was five officers and fifty-two men.

Fate
U-2514 was sunk on 8 April 1945, by bombs, in the Blohm & Voss shipyard in Hamburg. U-2514 was more than likely caught in the same RAF Bomber Command raid made up of Lancaster and Halifax bombers that sunk . The wreck was later raised and broken up.

References

Bibliography

External links
 

Type XXI submarines
U-boats commissioned in 1944
U-boats sunk in 1945
World War II submarines of Germany
1944 ships
Ships built in Hamburg
Maritime incidents in April 1945